Edward Allen (31 August 1875–unknown) was a Scottish footballer who played in the Football League for Newcastle United.

References

1875 births
Scottish footballers
English Football League players
Association football defenders
Montrose F.C. players
Dundee Wanderers F.C. players
Millwall F.C. players
Newcastle United F.C. players
Dundee F.C. players
Watford F.C. players
Year of death missing